Temple Street Productions is a Canadian television, film, and digital media production company based in Toronto, Ontario, Canada, owned by Boat Rocker Studios, a division of Boat Rocker Media.

Past and present Temple Street projects include Orphan Black, The Next Step, Being Erica, Wingin' It, Billable Hours, Queer as Folk, Darcy's Wild Life, Canada's Next Top Model, How Do You Solve a Problem Like Maria?, Style Her Famous, Spoiled Rotten, Mr. Friday, Recipe to Riches, Cover Me Canada, Over the Rainbow, Gavin Crawford's Wild West, Blueprint for Disaster and Killjoys.

History

Temple Street Productions was founded in 1996 by Patrick Whitley and Sheila Hockin. The Whitley and Hockin era saw production of Showtime co-production Queer as Folk and children’s comedy Darcy’s Wild Life, as well as the first seasons of Canada’s Next Top Model and Billable Hours.

In 2003, entertainment lawyers Ivan Schneeberg and David Fortier left Toronto law firm Goodmans LLP to enter the TV production business. Despite their lack of practical experience in television, they found employment with Temple Street, a former client of Goodmans, and used their legal expertise to produce the law office sitcom Billable Hours, written by another former Goodmans lawyer, Adam Till.

In 2006, Whitley and Hockin sold the company to Schneeberg and Fortier, who by then had been co-presidents of the dramatic production arm, Temple Street Entertainment, for three years. Whitley retired from production, while Hockin became a freelance producer and continued to work with Temple Street in a limited capacity. In Whitley and Hockin’s last year the company generated $32 million from production, making it the 13th-most profitable independent Canadian production company, according to trade journal Playback.

Schneeberg and Fortier now act as executive producers for most of the Temple Street’s projects. They are joined in the overseeing of the company’s day-to-day operations by managing director John Young, who has been instrumental in the company’s move to increase the output of digital media and branded content.

In late 2008, BBC Worldwide acquired a 25 per cent minority stake in Temple Street. This deal gave Temple Street the first look option to produce BBC Worldwide products and licensed media in Canada while providing BBC Worldwide with a first look option for the international distribution of all Temple Street productions. At this time Matt Forde, EVP of Co-productions, TV Sales and Digital Distribution North America at BBC Worldwide joined Schneeberg, Fortier, and Young on the Temple Street board of directors.

In 2013, the company opened a production office in Los Angeles, under the direction of VP of factual entertainment Gerry McKean. Temple Street Ventures division set up its digital studio unit, Boat Rocker Studios, in June 2013 with the production facilities opening in first quarter 2014. Rocker Studios assisted YouTube producers.

In July 2015, the company received a sizeable cash investment from Fairfax Financial Holdings Ltd. This led in early 2016 to Temple Street reorganizing such that Temple Street became a division of Boat Rocker Studios, which is a unit of Boat Rocker Media. Temple Street would only handle TV productions.

Current projects
Temple Street has developed a reputation for producing Canadian versions of American reality formats, including Canada’s Next Top Model and the upcoming Canadian iteration of bridal shopping show Say Yes to the Dress.

Their most successful current projects are tween dance drama The Next Step and the sci-fi drama Orphan Black. The Next Step is the highest rated show on the Family Channel, and Temple Street has partnered with BWI, Brands With Influence, to license the show in the U.K. They have also partnered with Segal Licensing in Canada, which brokered an exclusive deal with Walmart to sell The Next Step merchandise.

Temple Street also send the series’ stars on tour in 2015 in a sold-out 28-city, 40-show stage show, The Next Step Live. Orphan Black, meanwhile, is the highest rated original show on Bell Media’s Space channel. Schneeberg and Fortier credit the show with “legitimizing” their production model, recuperating the image of Canadian television abroad, where it was formerly seen as cheap and lacking in transnational appeal. Both The Next Step and Orphan Black are produced in partnership with BBC Worldwide, which manages all international distribution of the programs.

Other current shows include recipe competition reality show Recipe to Riches, soon to premiere its third season, and Million Dollar Critic, a BBC America co-produced reality program in which London Times restaurant critic Giles Coren travels to and evaluates North American restaurants.

Temple Street’s next fictional series is a co-production with Space and American cable channel SyFy which premiered in 2015. The show, Killjoys, is a science fiction tale of interplanetary bounty hunters caught in the middle of an intergalactic war. This marks the second collaboration between Space and Temple Street, who previously worked together on Orphan Black. Bell Senior VP Catherine MacLeod highlighted the appeal of the transnational and intranational partnerships in a statement: "We're delighted that Canadian productions continue to resonate beyond our borders. We have a strong partnership already with Temple Street Productions, and we are very much looking forward to Syfy joining us on this inter-galactic adventure."

Another project is X Company, starring Hugh Dillon and Orphan Black’s Evelyne Brochu, a CBC drama based on a real-life spy training school started in Canada during World War II. The Canadian-Hungarian show is a co-production with Stillking Films and debut in 2015. Schneeberg and Fortier have claimed that it would be "an exciting and compelling show, filled with spies, sabotage, action, tragedy and triumph, grounded in an incredibly rich and engaging piece of history (of which little has been told)."

Upcoming projects
On the reality front, in addition to Say Yes to the Dress Canada, Temple Street is developing Restaurant Revolution, an hour-long cooking competition show where chefs and sous chefs must each create a three-course meal, with the winner determined by real diners who will pay whatever they think the meal is worth.

The Remix Project
In 2009 and 2010, Temple Street was a key partner in The Remix Project, a social program to offer film and television production training to aspiring young filmmakers. The final result, a series of 10 short films, was screened at the TIFF Bell Lightbox in 2010 under the title City Life Film Project.

Awards

Since 2009, Temple Street projects have earned 12 Canadian Screen Awards, 10 Gemini Awards, 4 Shaw Rocket Prizes, 2 AToMiC Awards, 2 EWwy Awards, 1 Canadian Comedy Award, 1 DGC Award, 1 WGC Screenwriting Award, 1 C21/Frapa Format Award, 1 Leo Award, 1 Peabody Award, and 1 Mention Spéciale du Jury Européen at Le 15e Festival de la Fiction TV. Their award-winning productions include Being Erica, Billable Hours, Canada’s Next Top Model, Wingin’ It, The Next Step, Gavin Crawford’s Wild West, Rags to Riches, and Orphan Black.

In addition, executive producers David Fortier and Ivan Schneeberg received the Lionsgate/Maple Pictures Innovative Producer Award at the 2010 Banff World Television Awards for Temple Street's "incredible achievement in television and digital media."

References

External links
 

Television production companies of Canada
Canadian companies established in 1996
Mass media companies established in 1996
Film production companies of Canada
1996 establishments in Ontario
Companies based in Toronto